Leicester Secular Hall is a Grade II listed building in Leicester, England. It was built in 1881 for  the city's Secular Society.

The Leicester Secular Hall Co. Ltd for its construction. The lead shareholder was Josiah Gimson, an engineer and councillor. Ownership of the Hall subsequently passed to the Leicester Rationalist Trust. 

The building is located in the centre of Leicester at 75 Humberstone Gate. It was designed by W Larner Sugden of Leek, Staffordshire. The frontage contains five busts depicting, in chronological order,  Socrates, Jesus, Voltaire, Thomas Paine, and Robert Owen.

History
The building of the hall was proposed in 1872 after George Holyoake, who coined the word "secularism", was refused the use of a public room for a lecture. George Bernard Shaw and William Morris are among the many radical thinkers who have spoken there.

Current plans
The ground floor was partially refurbished and accessible toilets installed in 2013 funded by the members of Leicester Secular Society and Biffa. There are ambitious plans, with assistance from Heritage Lottery Fund grants, to fully refurbish the building to meet modern standards, including disabled access to the upper floors.

External links
Leicester Secular Society

Leicester
Tourist attractions in Leicestershire
Secularism in England
Grade II listed buildings in Leicestershire
Buildings and structures in Leicester
Cultural infrastructure completed in 1881
1881 establishments in England